The Blue Oak Ranch Reserve, a unit of the University of California Natural Reserve System, is an ecological reserve and biological field station in Santa Clara County, California.

The land, part of the 19th century Mexican land grant of Rancho Cañada de Pala, was donated to the University of California on December 1, 2007 by the Blue Oak Ranch Trust, an anonymous benefactor.

Overnight accommodations for academic researchers and educational groups may be made by permission only.

Flora
Flora of Blue Oak Ranch Reserve includes:
purple needle grass (Nassella pulchra)
barley (Hordeum)
bluegrass (Poa spp.)
three-awn (Aristida spp.)
melic (Melica sspspp
wildrye (Elymus and Leymus spp.)

Invasive introduced species
yellow starthistle (Centaurea solstitialis)
medusahead grass (Taeniatherum caput-medusae)
Italian thistle (Carduus pycnocephalus)
tocalote (Centaurea melitensis)
Canada thistle (Cirsium arvense)
bull thistle (Cirsium vulgare)

Plant communities
valley oak woodland
black oak woodland
coast live oak woodland
riparian forest
chamise chaparral
Diablan sage scrub
non-native annual grassland
wildflower field
native perennial grassland

Fauna
Fauna of Blue Oak Ranch Reserve includes:
Western toad
Pacific tree frog
Pacific chorus frog
red-legged frog
California newt
California tiger salamander
Western pond turtle
red-winged blackbird
pied-billed grebe
Canada goose
American coot
wood duck

Invasive fish
sunfish
largemouth bass
mosquitofish

See also
Quercus douglasii — Blue oak
California oak woodlands — a plant community within the ranch
California interior chaparral and woodlands — the plant community that the ranch is within
California chaparral and woodlands ecoregion — ecoregion of the Mediterranean forests, woodlands, and scrub Biome, that the ranch is within
List of California native plants
Restoration ecology

References

External links
 Blue Oak Ranch Reserve official site
 Blue Oak Reserve: University of California Natural Reserve System

University of California Natural Reserve System
Protected areas of Santa Clara County, California
Diablo Range
Natural history of the California Coast Ranges
Ecological restoration
Environment of the San Francisco Bay Area
California chaparral and woodlands
Ranches in California
University of California, Berkeley